Vic Vipers Futsal Club is an Australian futsal club based in Victoria. They play in the F-League which is the top tier of Australian Futsal. The Vic Vipers was founded in late 1999 by Futsal Victoria.

References

External links
 

Futsal clubs in Australia
Futsal clubs established in 1999
1999 establishments in Australia
Sporting clubs in Melbourne